John Thompson Parker is an American activist, writer, and  coordinator of the Harriet Tubman Center for Social Justice. He was the candidate of the Workers World Party, a U.S. communist political party, for President of the United States in 2004. Parker has been a union organizer, public school teacher, and is a coordinator of  the International Action Center. He is a writer for Struggle for Socialism/La Lucha por Socialismo.

Early political activities

Parker organized his first union election at a steel plant in New Jersey when he was 18.

Electoral history

Parker was the candidate of the Workers World Party, a U.S. communist political party, for President of the United States in 2004.  Parker and his running mate was Teresa Gutierrez received 1,330 votes. The ticket was endorsed by the Liberty Union Party of Vermont. Parker also ran for U.S. Senate in California on the Peace and Freedom Party ticket in 2016 and 2018. In 2016, Parker received 22,374 votes running for the Senate seat vacated by Barbara Boxer. In 2018, running against Dianne Feinstein, he received 22,825 votes. He has announced his 2022 candidacy for the Senate seat currently held by Alex Padilla. In this election, he ran as a candidate for the Peace and Freedom Party, but was also part of the Left Unity Slate, a group of state-wide candidates endorsed by both the Peace and Freedom Party and the Green Party of California.

References

African-American candidates for President of the United States
Living people
Candidates in the 2004 United States presidential election
Candidates in the 2022 United States Senate elections
21st-century American politicians
Year of birth missing (living people)
Workers World Party presidential nominees
21st-century African-American politicians
Peace and Freedom Party politicians